Adolf Pollitzer, also Adolph Pollitzer (23 July 1832 – 14 November 1900) was a Hungarian Jewish violinist.

Biography
Pollitzer was born in Pest, Hungary.  In 1842, he left Pest for Vienna, where he studied the violin under Joseph Böhm at the Vienna Conservatory; and in his 14th year he took the first prize at the Conservatory. After a concert tour in Germany, he went to Paris and studied under Jean-Delphin Alard. In 1850 he crossed the Channel, and in London his remarkable talents as a violinist were recognized after a short time. He became leader at Her Majesty's Theatre under Sir Michael Costa and also led the new Philharmonic Orchestra and the Royal Choral Society.

Pollitzer was a preeminent in his day as an interpreter of classic chamber-music, his playing attaining to what may be called "the great style". As a teacher of his instrument, he was regarded as the most eminent of his time in England and many pupils who attained distinction had studied under him. In 1861, on the establishment of the London Academy of Music, he was appointed professor of violin. He held this position until 1870, when  he succeeded Dr. Henry Wylde as principal of the Academy and retained this position until his death, which occurred in London.

Pollitzer's pupils include Harold Bauer and Edward Elgar.

References 
 
 Jewish Chronicle, 23 November 1900

Webkinks 
 Obituary Adolphe Pollitzer – the Jewish Museum London
 Adolf Pollitzer from website of University of Leeds
 A Gold Watch for Adolphe Pollitzer
 Violin Giuseppe Guarnerius Del Gesù 1736 
 Pollitzer's Grave from Cemetery Scribes

Hungarian classical violinists
British violinists
British people of Hungarian-Jewish descent
Hungarian Jews
British Jews
Austro-Hungarian Jews
People from Pest, Hungary
1832 births
1900 deaths
19th-century classical violinists
British male violinists
19th-century British male musicians
Male classical violinists